Cinnaminson is a station on the River Line light rail system, located on Broad Street in Cinnaminson, New Jersey.

The station opened on March 15, 2004. Southbound service from the station is available to Camden, New Jersey. Northbound service is available to the Trenton Rail Station with connections to New Jersey Transit trains to New York City, SEPTA trains to Philadelphia, Pennsylvania, and Amtrak trains. Transfer to the PATCO Speedline is available at the Walter Rand Transportation Center.

The station is located across from the Cinnaminson Harbour condominium community. A pedestrian crosswalk provides access to the development, as well as to Bannard Street across the tracks.

Transfers 
New Jersey Transit buses: 419
 BurLink B10

References

External links

 Station from Google Maps Street View

River Line stations
Railway stations in the United States opened in 2004
2004 establishments in New Jersey
Railway stations in Burlington County, New Jersey